Aloysius Yap is a Singaporean former footballer who last played in the S.League for Woodlands Wellington FC.

Yap started off his S.League career with Balestier Khalsa in 2009, before moving on Gombak United in 2010. He moved to Woodlands Wellington FC in 2012 and made his debut for the Rams in their match against Tampines Rovers shortly after passing his beep test for the club.

He scored his first professional goal of his career while playing for Woodlands Wellington during a 3–1 loss to Tampines Rovers in a preliminary round match of the Starhub League Cup on 27 July 2012.

In August 2012, Aloysius left football to concentrate on a career in the private sector.

References

Singaporean footballers
Living people
1987 births
Balestier Khalsa FC players
Gombak United FC players
Woodlands Wellington FC players
Singapore Premier League players
Singaporean sportspeople of Chinese descent
Association football midfielders